The Restaurant Revitalization Fund is a $28.6 billion fund administered by the U.S. Small Business Administration that will provide relief to businesses hurt by the COVID-19 pandemic.

References

Economic responses to the COVID-19 pandemic
United States responses to the COVID-19 pandemic